Vladimir Soria Camacho (born 15 July 1964) is a Bolivian football manager and former player who played as a midfielder. He is the current assistant manager of Bolívar.

Club career
Soria was born in Cochabamba. At club level, he played most of his career for Bolívar, where he won 8 national titles. He played in 451 games netting 52 goals. He also participated in 93 Copa Libertadores matches and scored 4 goals. Soria is third player with more appearances in the history of this international competition.

National team
Between 1989 and 2000 Soria has earned 51 caps and one goal for the Bolivia national football team. Among the most important tournaments at international level, Soria played in the 1994 FIFA World Cup and Copa America 1997, where he was the national team's captain. His only goal came in a 1998 FIFA World Cup Qualifier on February 12, 1997 against Chile, when he opened the score in the 27th minute.

Managerial career
After retiring as a player in 2000, he had a short spell as Bolívar's manager. Years later, Soria also managed Wilstermann and Real Potosí.

Honours

Club
 Bolívar
 Liga de Fútbol Profesional Boliviano: 1985, 1986, 1988, 1991, 1992, 1994, 1996, and 1997

References

External links

rsssf.com

1964 births
Living people
Sportspeople from Cochabamba
Association football midfielders
Bolivian footballers
Club Bolívar players
Bolivia international footballers
1994 FIFA World Cup players
1997 Copa América players
1999 Copa América players
1999 FIFA Confederations Cup players
Bolivian football managers
Bolivia national football team managers
Club Bolívar managers
Club Real Potosí managers
C.D. Jorge Wilstermann managers
Nacional Potosí managers
Club San José managers